The Ahr Valley Railway, Remagen–Ahrbrück, is currently a 29 km-long, partly single-track and non-electrified branch line, which runs through the Ahr valley from Remagen via Ahrweiler and Dernau to Ahrbrück in the German state of Rhineland-Palatinate. It is served by Regionalbahn services on lines RB 30 and RB 39 (Deutsche Bahn timetable route number 477).

History 

The history of the Ahr Valley Railway begins as a branch line of the West Rhine Railway (Linke Rheinstrecke). This line was built up the Rhine from Cologne to Rolandseck via Bonn by the Bonn–Cologne Railway Company (Bonn-Cölner Eisenbahn-Gesellschaft) between 1844 and 1856; it was extended to Bingerbrück via Remagen and Koblenz by the Rhenish Railway Company (Rheinische Eisenbahn-Gesellschaft) in 1858/59.

On 23 September 1879, a ministerial decree was issued to authorise the building of the Ahr Valley Railway. Less than a year later, the Rhenish Railway opened the first section from Remagen to Ahrweiler on 17 September 1880. This was extended to Altenahr on 1 December 1886 and to Adenau on 15 July 1888.

For strategic reasons, two other lines were added in the Ahr valley in 1912 and 1913, establishing a small Ahr Valley Railway network. In 1912, the Dümpelfeld–Hillesheim (Eifel)–Lissendorf line was opened; this followed the upstream half of the Ahr and then branched off into the Ahlbach valley at Ahrdorf. The third side a triangle of railways was built to connect the two lines (the Dümpelfeld curve from Liers junction to Insul junction).

In 1913, the Ahrdorf–Blankenheim railway was opened; this ran up the rest of the Ahr valley from Ahrdorf to its source and then connected with the Eifel Railway.

There was a locomotive depot (Bahnbetriebswerk) in the middle of the line at Kreuzberg and lying parallel with it. At the same time, the original line was partially relocated and the Ahr Valley Railway was double-tracked from Remagen to Liers junction.

Construction was commenced on other new lines, such as the "strategic railway" that was intended to connect the Ahr valley from Dernau with Neuss via Rheinbach and Liblar bypassing Cologne, but they were not completed due to the First World War and the subsequent disarmament imposed under the peace treaty. The unfinished bridge at Ahrweiler has been in ruins above the village since 1925. During the Second World War, the already completed tunnels in the Ahr valley were used for the armaments industry, using forced labour, and were redeveloped between 1960 and 1972 as the German federal government bunker. The A 61 autobahn now runs on part of the line near Meckenheim and Rheinbach.

An extension south of Adenau did not complete its planning stage. Again, the main reasons for building the line would have been of a military nature.

Also for strategic reasons, the Ahr Valley Railway was extended over the Ludendorff Bridge (also known as the Bridge at Remagen) to connect with the East Rhine Railway (Rechte Rheinstrecke) to and from the north. However, the bridge was not completed until 1918. It was not rebuilt after its collapse just before the war ended in 1945.

The construction of the Siegfried Line gave the Ahr Valley railways great strategic importance. Therefore, it was heavily damaged by Allied air raids and by German demolitions with explosives during the Second World War. Nevertheless, the line was fully reopened by 1951. In the following years it was then partially closed and dismantled.

Limited passenger services were restored between Remagen and Kreuzberg on 2 June 1985 and extended to Ahrbrück (formerly Brück (Ahr)) in June 1996. Freight traffic between Hönningen (Ahr) and Adenau was abandoned on 31 May 1985. Freight traffic between Ahrbrück and Hönningen (Ahr) was abandoned on 31 December 1996 and the line to Hönningen (Ahr) was dismantled in order to build a bypass road.

The Ahr Valley Railway is still double-tracked until the Walporzheim crossover.

In the late 1990s, trains on the line were hauled by diesel locomotives of classes 213 and 215; Class 628 and later Bombardier Talent (class 622) diesel multiple units were also operated. In December 2013 LINT 81 (DB Class 622) took over the service scheduled for 20 years as part of the Vareo-branded regional rail network. 

The disused former second track between Mayschoß and Rech is now used for a rail trail, the Ahr-Radweg (Ahr Cycleway). The two adjoining branch lines are partially used as cycle ways.

On 14 July 2021 the water level of the Ahr rose to its highest level since 1910 as part of the 2021 European floods. Subsequently, seven bridges and about 20 km of track were destroyed. Passenger train service was suspended until further notice. On 8 November 2021, train service resumed between Remagen and Ahrweiler, and on 10 December 2021 to Walporzheim, while the section between Walporzheim and Ahrbrück remains out of service.

Operations

The Ahr Valley Railway is served by the following services:

 1 tph Rhein-Ahr-Bahn Regionalbahn service (RB 30) between Ahrbrück and Bonn Hauptbahnhof
 1 tph Ahrtal-Bahn Regionalbahn service (RB 39) between Dernau and Remagen, mondays to fridays only
Currently, these only run as far as Walporzheim, with replacement buses on the rest of the route.

Services on the line are operated by DB Regio NRW using class 622 (Bombardier Talent) diesel multiple units at speeds of to 120 km/h.

Fares

Rail services on the Ahr Valley Railway can be used with tickets of both the Verkehrsverbund Rhein-Mosel (VRM) and the Verkehrsverbund Rhein-Sieg (VRS), as well as the NRW-Tarif, a fare system that applies throughout North Rhine-Westphalia.

References

Sources

External links

 
 
  of the line

Railway lines in Rhineland-Palatinate
Railway lines opened in 1880
1880 establishments in Germany
Ahr